New Jersey's 29th Legislative District is one of 40 districts that make up the map for the New Jersey Legislature. It covers a portion of Essex County, specifically most of the east side of the city of Newark and all of the township of Belleville.

Demographic information 
As of the 2020 United States census, the district had a population of 249,255, of whom 192,742 (77.3%) were of voting age. The racial makeup of the district was 46,930 (18.8%) White, 82,416 (33.1%) African American, 2,008 (0.8%) Native American, 7,733 (3.1%) Asian, 172 (0.1%) Pacific Islander, 72,824 (29.2%) from some other race, and 37,172 (14.9%) from two or more races. Hispanic or Latino of any race were 113,095 (45.4%) of the population.

The district had 130,950 registered voters , of whom 52,189 (39.9%) were registered as unaffiliated, 67,880 (51.8%) were registered as Democrats, 9,137 (7.0%) were registered as Republicans, and 1,744 (1.3%) were registered to other parties.

Political representation 
For the 2022–2023 session, the district is represented in the State Senate by Teresa Ruiz (D, Newark) and in the General Assembly by Eliana Pintor Marin (D, Newark) and Shanique Speight (D, Newark).

The legislative district overlaps with New Jersey's 8th, 10th, and New Jersey's 11th  congressional districts.

Apportionment history 
Since the creation of the 40-district legislative map in 1973, the 29th District has always been based in and around Newark. In the 1973 map, the 29th district consisted of most of the South and East Wards (excluding Ironbound) and a portion of the Central Ward. For the 1981 redistricting, the 29th became all of the South and East Wards and a larger part of the Central Ward. In the 1991 redistricting, the 29th continued encompassing the South and East Wards and part of the Central Ward; the district now crept into a part of the North Ward and entered a new municipality, Hillside in Union County. In the 2001 redistricting, Hillside remained in the district but now most of the area of Newark was contained in the 29th District. After the 2011 redistricting, Hillside was removed and Belleville was moved into the district; again, most of the area of the city remained in the 29th.

Because of its heavily urban nature, the district tends to favor Democrats strongly. The 29th District is one of the few districts in the state to have ever elected only one party to all Senate and Assembly seats in every election since 1973.

Election history

Election results

Senate

General Assembly

References 

Essex County, New Jersey
29